The Territorial Prelature of Mixes is a Latin Church missionary territory or territorial prelature of the Catholic Church in Mexico. It is a suffragan in the ecclesiastical province of the metropolitan Archdiocese of Antequera. The prelature is named for the city of San Juan Juquila Mixes and the Mixe people, with the episcopal see of Ayutla.

History
The Territorial Prelature of Mixes was erected on 21 December 1964.

The present ordinary, Salvador Cleofás Murguía Villalobos, is a Salesian of Don Bosco from the Mexico-Guadalajara (MEG) province. After his term as provincial, he was appointed to the Central Department of Formation of the Salesians of Don Bosco, in Rome. In 2018 he was nominated to succeed Msgr. Héctor Guerrero Córdova as the bishop of the Mixes Prelature.

Ordinaries
Braulio Sánchez Fuentes, S.D.B. (1970 - 2000)
Luis Felipe Gallardo Martín del Campo, S.D.B. (2000 - 2006), appointed Bishop of Veracruz 
Héctor Guerrero Córdova, S.D.B. (2007 - 2018)
Salvador Cleofás Murguía S.D.B. (2018–Present)

References

Mixes
Territorial prelatures
Roman Catholic dioceses and prelatures established in the 20th century
Roman Catholic Ecclesiastical Province of Antequera, Oaxaca
1964 establishments in Mexico